Cinthya Peraza Fernández (born 5 June 1993) is a Mexican footballer who plays for Santos Laguna in Liga MX Femenil.

Early career
In 2017, Peraza represented Mexico at the 2017 Homeless World Cup in Oslo, scoring 15 goals as Mexico won the women's tournament.

Club career

Santos Laguna
In December 2018, Peraza signed with Liga MX Femenil side Santos Laguna.

International career
On 23 October 2021, Peraza made her debut for the Mexico national team in a 6–1 victory over Argentina at Estadio Gregorio "Tepa" Gómez.

References

External links 
 

1993 births
Living people
Sportspeople from Mazatlán
Footballers from Sinaloa
Mexican women's footballers
Women's association football midfielders
Santos Laguna (women) players
Liga MX Femenil players
Mexico women's international footballers
Mexican footballers